Glow of the Firefly is a 2014 Bangladeshi drama film written and directed by Khalid Mahmud Mithu. It was selected as the Bangladeshi entry for the Best Foreign Language Film at the 87th Academy Awards, but was not nominated.

Cast
 Emon as Suborno
 Bidya Sinha Saha Mim as Kabita
 Kalyan Corraya
 Tariq Anam Khan
 Diti
 Mita Choudowary
 Masud Ali Khan as Anis
 Gazi Rakayet as SM Sultan
 Shams Sumon
 Putul
 Anis

See also
 List of submissions to the 87th Academy Awards for Best Foreign Language Film
 List of Bangladeshi submissions for the Academy Award for Best Foreign Language Film

References

External links
 

2014 films
2014 romantic drama films
2010s Bengali-language films
Bengali-language Bangladeshi films
Bangladeshi romantic drama films
Films scored by Ibrar Tipu
Films scored by Emon Saha
Impress Telefilm films